"Candidatus Bartonella mayotimonensis" is a candidatus bacteria from the genus of Bartonella which can cause endocarditis in humans

References

Bartonellaceae
Bacteria described in 2010
Candidatus taxa